El Crucero is a municipality in the Managua department of Nicaragua.

It is located on the summit and slopes of the Sierras de Managua, east of Jinotepe, and its urban center is the town of El Crucero.

References

Municipalities of the Managua Department